Raja Ali (5 July 1976 – 21 October 2012) was an Indian cricketer. He played first-class cricket for Madhya Pradesh and Railways between 1996 and 2008. He died of cardiac arrest.

References

External links
 

1976 births
2012 deaths
Indian cricketers
Madhya Pradesh cricketers
Railways cricketers
Cricketers from Bhopal